Fisherman Island is the southernmost island on the Delmarva Peninsula chain of barrier islands. Located at the entrance to the Chesapeake Bay, the island is subject to great changes in its landscape from waves and runoff. It first formed about 200 to 250 years ago.

Gun batteries were emplaced on the island to defend Chesapeake Bay in both world wars; these were part of Fort John Custis during World War II. The US Navy used Fisherman Island from 1949 to 1969.

Fisherman Island National Wildlife Refuge is located near the United States Fish and Wildlife Service's Eastern Shore of Virginia National Wildlife Refuge, and is cut in half by the presence of U.S. Highway 13 and the Chesapeake Bay Bridge Tunnel. The refuge is closed to the public.

The island is the habitat to migratory waterfowl, shorebirds, and nesting waterbirds. In September 2003, the island was almost entirely flooded by Hurricane Isabel.

References

External links
Fisherman Island National Wildlife Refuge - official site
Landscape Modifications by Hurricane Isabel, Fisherman Island, Virginia

Barrier islands of Virginia
Protected areas of Northampton County, Virginia
National Wildlife Refuges in Virginia
Protected areas established in 1973
1973 establishments in Virginia
Islands of Northampton County, Virginia